"World Goes Round" is a song by American musician Ross Mintzer, released as a single 2013. "World Goes Round" was recorded by the Ross Mintzer Band.

Personnel 
Ross Mintzer - vocals, acoustic guitar
Kevin Ryan - Harmonica
Crystal Powell - Vocals

References

2013 songs
2013 singles